The 2017–18 Western Kentucky Lady Toppers basketball team represents Western Kentucky University during the 2017–18 NCAA Division I women's basketball season. The Lady Toppers are led by fifth year head coach Michelle Clark-Heard. They play their home games at E. A. Diddle Arena and were members of Conference USA. They finished the season 24–9, 12–4 in C-USA play to finish in second place. They won the Conference USA Tournament for the 2nd year in a row and earns an automatic bid to the NCAA women's basketball tournament where they were defeated by Oregon State in the first round.

On March 27, Michelle Clark-Heard has resigned from Western Kentucky to accept the head coaching job at Cincinnati. She finished with a five-year record of 154–48.

Previous season
They finished the season 27–8, 16–2 in C-USA play to win the Conference USA regular season and also won the Conference USA Tournament. They received an automatic bid to the NCAA women's basketball tournament where they were defeated by Ohio State in the first round.

Roster

Schedule

|-
!colspan=9 style=| Exhibition

|-
!colspan=9 style=| Non-conference regular season

|-

|-

|-

|-

|-

|-

|-

|-

|-

|-

|-

|-

|-
!colspan=9 style=| Conference USA regular season
|-

|-

|-

|-

|-

|-

|-

|-

|-

|-

|-

|-

|-

|-

|-

|-

|-
!colspan=9 style=| Conference USA Women's Tournament

|-
!colspan=9 style=| NCAA Women's Tournament

Rankings
2017–18 NCAA Division I women's basketball rankings

See also
2017–18 Western Kentucky Hilltoppers basketball team

References

Western Kentucky Lady Toppers basketball seasons
WKU
WKU
WKU
WKU